The Sherzad tribe is one of the three major sub-tribes of the Khogyani tribe of Karlani Pashtun.  The Sherzad are primarily found in the central regions of Nangarhar Province, Afghanistan, particularly Sherzad District. 

Ethnic groups in Nangarhar Province
Karlani Pashtun tribes